Thanlon is a subdivisional headquarters in the Indian state of Manipur. It is situated 3819 feet above sea level. It is situated at Pherzawl District. It is also known as Tualbual.

History

Thanlon was selected by C.S.Booth, the then S.D.O., Tamenglong to be an administrative outpost within the erstwhile Tamenglong subdivision. Therefore it was an administrative outpost from 1934 until it was upgraded to a circle officer’ headquarters in 1946. The area occupied by government servants is known as Thanlon Lambulane and the area occupied by the Chief and his villagers is known as Tualbual.

Lumthang was a great chief of Ngaihte clan of Simte tribe. A century ago, he had established Thanlon (Tualbual) village. Major J Shakespeare, SMS, gave him a boundary paper dated 11 February 1906 written in Lushai language which is reproduced below:

Lumthanga, Ramri Pathawna'n lengphun kawna, Vanggui lui, Cherchi lui, Derkai kawn, Derkai lui, Tuivai Pamjal lui, Kaihlam tlangdung, Ramvawm lui, Tuipui Thlanlawn lui, Kotukawn Tualbual lui Tuijang Pathawng lungphun.

About Thanlon
Thanlon is sub divisional headquarters and about 150 km from  Churachandpur town on NH-150.

References 

Villages in Pherzawl district